General elections were due to be held in Sark on 16 December 2020 and will serve for 4 years, until December 2024.

Electoral system 
The 28 members of the Chief Pleas are elected via plurality block voting for four-year terms in two tranches. The 2020 election was held to replace nine members who had been elected with the four-year term beginning in 2016.

Results 
Only six candidates vied and were elected unopposed for the nine available seats, meaning a further election needed to be held to elect the three seats that remained vacant. Until the second election was held on 3 March 2021, three members were appointed interim Conseillers. However, at the second election, only two candidates stood and were elected unopposed to fill the three vacancies, meaning there was one remaining.

Edric Baker
Tony Eric Le Lievre
Frank William Makepeace
Fern Joanne Turner
Paul Joseph Williams
Sandra Williams

Pippa Rose Donovan 
Joseph Michael Donovan

References 

Sark
Elections in Sark
2020 in Guernsey
December 2020 events in the United Kingdom